This is the filmography of American voice actor Dee Bradley Baker.

Voice-over filmography

Animation

Feature films

Direct-to-video and television films

Video games

Other voice-over roles
 California Screamin' (2006–2010) theme park attraction – Original host
 Pirates of the Caribbean theme park attraction – Parrot
 Star Tours: The Adventures Continue theme park attraction – Boba Fett
 Video Games Live with the San Diego Symphony (San Diego Comic-Con 2008 performance only) – Performer
 Shelf Life (2011–14) – Samurai Snake – web series by Yuri Lowenthal and Tara Platt
 Special Relativity (2015) radio series – Prince of the Pigeon People, General Fith

Live-action filmography

Television

Film

Notes

References

General citations

Book citations
 

 
 

Male actor filmographies
American filmographies